William Hale Barrett (September 10, 1866 – May 1, 1941), frequently known as W. H. Barrett, was a United States district judge of the United States District Court for the Southern District of Georgia.

Education and career

Barrett received a Bachelor of Philosophy degree from the University of Georgia in 1885 and read law to enter the bar in 1887. He was the Principal of the Central Grammar School of Augusta, Georgia from 1885 to 1887, entering private practice in Georgia from 1887 to 1922. He was recorder for the Augusta Police Court from 1894 to 1898, and was city attorney of Augusta from 1898 to 1904. In 1916, he along with James Meriwether Hull formed the law firm known today as Hull Barrett, P.C.

Federal judicial service

On June 14, 1922, Barrett was nominated by President Warren G. Harding to a seat on the United States District Court for the Southern District of Georgia vacated by Judge Beverly Daniel Evans Jr. Barrett was confirmed by the United States Senate on June 22, 1922, and received his commission the same day, serving thereafter until his death on May 1, 1941.

References

Sources
 
 

1866 births
1941 deaths
Georgia (U.S. state) state court judges
Judges of the United States District Court for the Southern District of Georgia
United States district court judges appointed by Warren G. Harding
20th-century American judges
United States federal judges admitted to the practice of law by reading law